Giuseppe Cavallo (died 1684 in Naples) was an Italian composer and priest. He was maestro di canto at the conservatory and assistant to his teacher Francesco Provenzale. His oratorio Il Giuditio universale was recorded by Antonio Florio.

References

Italian Baroque composers
1684 deaths
Year of birth unknown
17th-century Italian composers
Italian male classical composers
17th-century male musicians